Antonín Perner (29 January 1899 – 24 November 1973) was a Czechoslovak footballer. He played 28 games and scored one goal for the Czechoslovakia national football team. Perner represented Czechoslovakia at the 1920 Olympics.

References

1899 births
1973 deaths
Czech footballers
Czechoslovak footballers
Czechoslovakia international footballers
AC Sparta Prague players
Bohemians 1905 players
Olympic footballers of Czechoslovakia
Footballers at the 1920 Summer Olympics
Association football midfielders
Footballers from Prague
People from the Kingdom of Bohemia